Mengal (Balochi: مینگل ) are a Brahui speaking Baloch tribe in Balochistan, Pakistan.

Clans
There are two main clans of Mengal tribe, namely Shahizai Mengal and Zagar Mengal.

Shahizai Mengal inhabits in central and southern parts of Balochistan mainly Wadh, Khuzdar and Lasbella whereas Zagar Mengals inhabits the northwest and central parts of  Balochistan mainly Nushki, Chagai, and Kalat.

Prominent people
 Sardar Attaullah Mengal was the head (sardar) of Shahizai Mengal tribe. He was Chief Minister of Balochistan.
 Sardar Akhtar Mengal is the current head (sardar) of Shahizai Mengal tribe. He was also a Chief Minister of Balochistan. He is also the head of Balochistan National Party (Mengal)
 Mir Amir-ul-Mulk Mengal was Governor and Chief Justice of Balochistan. He was also the recipient of Hilal-e-Imtiaz on 23 March 2008.
 Mr. Justice Ghulam Mustafa Mengal was Chief Justice of Balochistan High Court and Chairman Zakat Council Balochistan. 
Ex Senator Mir Muhammad Naseer Mengal served as acting Chief Minister of Balochistan and as Minister of State for Petroleum and Natural Resources.
Mir Nooruddin Mengal was a prominent politician of Balochistan. He was assassinated on 13 October 2010.
Mir Lawang Khan Mengal was a politician and tribal leader.
 Naseer Mengal was a former caretaker chief minister of Balochistan.
 Lieutenant Colonel (retd) Sultan Mohammed Khan Mengal was a Pakistan Army personnel and the oldest army veteran in Pakistan.
 Mir Gul Khan Nasir, poet, historian and politician

References

Brahui tribes
Baloch tribes
Social groups of Pakistan